Johan Brunström and Andreas Siljeström were the defending champions but chose not to defend their title.

Grégoire Barrère and Jonathan Eysseric won the title after defeating Yūichi Sugita and Wu Di 6–3, 6–2 in the final.

Seeds

Draw

References
 Main Draw

Doubles
Bangkok Challenger - Doubles
 in Thai tennis